Ellinor Skagegård & 5th Season is a pop band from Uppsala, Sweden, formed in 2007. The group is built around the songwriting of Ellinor Skagegård, with influences from pop, folk, jazz and musical.

History
Since 2004 Ellinor Skagegård has performed with different groups and musicians, for example Mistletoe and the Swedish singing duo Svavelsyster. She recorded the EP "Fall Adventure" in 2007 together with Rickard Hultberg. Later that year they met up with drummer Daniel Färnstrand and guitarist Magnus Backström and formed "Ellinor Skagegård & 5th Season". The group had a number of bassists along the years and the seat was finally taken by Leonidas Aretakis in 2010. 
In May 2010 they released their debut album "First Time".

Members
Ellinor Skagegård – Lead vocals, piano
Rickard Hultberg – Electric guitar
Magnus Backström – Backing vocals, electric and acoustic guitar
Leonidas Aretakis – Bass
Daniel Färnstrand – Drums

Discography
Fall Adventure - 2007
First Time - 2010

References

Notes

External links
Ellinor Skagegård & 5th Season at MySpace

Swedish pop music groups
Swedish folk music groups